The 1st World Outgames took place in Montréal, Quebec, Canada from July 26, 2006, to August 5, 2006. The international conference was held from July 26 to the 29. The sporting events were held from July 29 to August 5.

History
The event evolved out of a dispute concerning spending for the 2006 Gay Games (formally called Gay Games VII), which Montréal had been awarded. However, the Gay Games sanctioners (Federation of Gay Games) and Montréal 2006 quarrelled over the budget and scale of the Games and the amount of control each party would exercise; subsequently, the FGG parted company with Montréal, awarding the games to Chicago.

It was the second major multi-sport sporting event that Montréal had hosted since the Montréal Olympics in 1976. It used facilities from the Olympics and those from the 2005 World Aquatic Championships, the previous major multi-sport event in Montréal. The Outgames Montréal 2006 were larger than the 2006 Gay Games in number of events and amount spent but not in the number of participants.

Unlike the Gay Games, the 1st World Outgames also included non-sport events, such as a Country-Western Dance competition (as well as exhibitions) and a Choral Festival that also had a competitive component.

The event was held concurrently with Divers/Cité, the city's primary LGBT pride festival. The increased number of LGBT tourists in town for the Outgames had been expected to be a financial boon for Divers/Cité, but ironically that festival's attendance and revenues actually declined from previous years. According to Divers/Cité director Suzanne Girard, "even if there were more people than usual, there were 10,000 more things to do." Later in the year, as a result of the financial impacts of the Outgames, Divers/Cité dropped its pride programming and repositioned itself as an arts and music festival, leading to the creation of the new Fierté Montréal to take over as the city's pride festival.
 
A Quebec government audit revealed a CAD 5.3 million deficit for the 2006 Outgames on a CAD 15 million total budget on November 13, 2006. On December 7, 2006, Outgames Montréal 2006 filed for bankruptcy protection. Of the deficit, CAD 3.1 million was in loans from the governments of Montréal and Quebec, while the other CAD 2.2 million was due to private companies and individuals.

Organizing committee
 Mark Tewksbury, co-president
 Marielle Dupéré, co-president
 Paul Uline, Secretary
 François Goulet, Director
 Marie-Josée Malo, Director
 Johanne Roy, Director
 Pierre Côté, Director

International Conference on LGBT Human Rights
The Outgames Montréal 2006 included an International Conference on LGBT Human Rights immediately prior to the games themselves, from July 26 to July 29. With attendance of some 2,000 participants, it was the largest conference on LGBT rights ever held.

The four-day conference consisted of five plenary sessions on the United States and Canada, Africa and the Arab World, Latin America, Asia and the Pacific, and Europe, in addition to the opening and closing sessions. Keynote speakers included Gérald Tremblay, Gene Robinson, Mark Tewksbury, Irshad Manji, Mariela Castro, Georgina Beyer, Waheed Alli, Martin Cauchon, Li Yinhe and Martina Navratilova.

Louise Arbour, UN High Commissioner for Human Rights, delivered an especially well-received speech at the opening dinner, which gave particular encouragement to the conference's goal of recognition at the United Nations.

There were also more than a hundred workshops on more specific themes, as well as programmes of workshops on sport, business, and international affairs.

The conference concluded with the issuance of the Declaration of Montréal on LGBT Human Rights, a declaration that will be submitted to the United Nations.

Opening Ceremonies

Opening Ceremonies for the 1st Outgames Montréal 2006 were held at the Olympic Stadium on Saturday, July 29, 2006. The performance was broadcast by Radio-Canada, Canada's national French-language public broadcaster.

After the parade of nations, the Declaration of Montréal was read by Mark Tewksbury and Martina Navratilova. Gérald Tremblay, Mayor of Montréal, Line Beauchamp, Quebec Minister of Culture, and Michael Fortier, federal Minister of Public Works, represented the three levels of government; Fortier was loudly booed, reflecting anger among the LGBT community regarding the Conservative government's stances on gay rights, including the announcement of a motion to reopen debate on the Civil Marriage Act and same-sex marriage in Canada. 

After the athletes' and officials' oath were taken by Charles Boyer and Diane Bandy respectively, Mayor Tremblay officially declared the Outgames open.

Using the theme of "the circle", the concept of the show integrated music, song, dance, choruses, mass choreography and performances by the Cirque du Soleil.

Artists who performed at the opening ceremonies included:
k.d. lang
Martha Wash
Deborah Cox
Jonas
Sylvie Desgroseilliers
Diane Dufresne
Cirque du Soleil

Venues
Over 50 venues in Montréal hosted events for the 1st World Outgames. Three main areas gathered most of the activities, the largest being the Claude Robillard Sports Complex, in addition to the Montréal Olympic Park and the Jean Drapeau Park. The Outgames used most of the venues built for the Montréal Summer Olympics of 1976. Other venues included the Golf Metropolitain Anjou for golfing, the Parc du Domaine Vert à Mirabel for mountain biking, the Little Italy neighbourhood for the road cycling criterium, as well as various parks across the city for sports such as soccer, tennis, and softball.

The Choral Festival took place at Salle Pierre Mercure from Tuesday, August 1, 2006, through Thursday, August 3, 2006.

The main social and entertainment location for non-sporting events during the Outgames Montréal 2006 was located at the west side of Viger Square.

35 Sporting events contested including
Rowing
Aerobics
Billiards
Badminton
Dragon boat regatta
Table tennis
Figure skating
Tennis
Golf
Track and field
Handball
Triathlon
Ice hockey
Volleyball
Karate
Water polo
Marathon
Wrestling
Physique
Bowling
Outsplash

Participating teams

 English Bay Triathlon Club
 Team Vancouver
 Team Frankfurt a. M.
 Tangra, Bulgaria
 Melbourne Spikers Volleyball, Australia
 Team Colorado
 Melbourne Argonauts Queer Rowing Club, Australia
 Equipe San Francisco, California, United States
 London Spikers Volleyball Club, London, UK

Results

15 Participating Ensembles in the Choral Festival 

 Ensemble Vocal Ganymède (Men's Choir from Montreal, Canada) / Director: Yvan Sabourin / Pianist: Dominic Lupien
 Mélo'Men (Men's Choir from Paris, France) / Director: John Dawkins / Pianist: Michel Simard
 Colla Voce (Men's Choir from San Francisco, U.S.A.) / Director: Steve Ng / Pianist: Doug McGrath
 Ensemble Vocal Extravaganza (Mixed Choir from Montreal, Canada) / Director: François Monette / Pianist: Daphnée Boisvert
 Mélo'Singers (Men's Choir from Paris, France) / Director: John Dawkins / Pianist: Michel Simard
 Sydney Gay & Lesbian Choir (Mixed Choir from Sydney, Australia) / Director: Sarah Penicka / Pianist: Gareth Chan
 Manchester Lesbian & Gay Chorus (Mixed Choir from Manchester, U.K.) / Director: Jeff Borradaile
 Choeur Gai de Montréal (Men's Choir from Montreal, Canada) / Director: François Monette
 Gay Asian Pacific Alliance Men's Chorus (GAPA) (Men's Choir from San Francisco, U.S.A.) / Director: Randall Kikukawa / Pianist: Desmond Tan
 Combined Gay & Lesbian Choir of Australasia (Mixed Choir from Melbourne and Sydney, Australia; and Auckland, New Zealand) / Director: Jonathon Welch
 Mexico Folklorigay* (Dance Company from Mexico)
 Rainbow Symphony Orchestra* (Orchestra from Paris, France) / Director: John Dawkins / Soloist: Sonia Sasseville, contralto
 Women's International Choir** / Director: Andrée Dagenais / Pianist: Nathalie Bellerive
 Men's International Choir** / Director: John Dawkins / Pianist: Michel Simard
 Mixed International Choir** / Director: Jeff Buhrman / Pianist: Michel Simard / Violinist: Don Dimmitt

*Closing night concert only (non-competitive)

**Consisting of singers from the 10 participating choruses, closing night concert only (non-competitive)

Members of the Jury 

 Ms. Patricia Abbott, executive director, Association of Canadian Choral Conductors
 Mr. Martin Dagenais, Choral Director
 Mr. Jean-Sébastion Vallée, Choral Director

Choral Festival Results 
Registration information and all subsequent printed materials for the Choral Festival indicated that Gold, Silver and Bronze Medals would be awarded to the top ensembles in three categories: Large Chorus, Medium Chorus, and Small Chorus (determined by the number of singers). However, at the Medal Presentations on Thursday, August 3, the following achievements were announced:

 1st Place Gold Medalists: Mélo'Men (a Medium Chorus)
 2nd Place Silver Medalists: Ensemble Vocal Ganymède (a Large Chorus)
 3rd Place Bronze Medalists: Mélo'Singers (a Large Chorus)
 Honorable Mention (no medals): Colla Voce (a Small Chorus)

Under the award decisions as published, Ensemble Vocal Ganymède should have been awarded the gold medal for Large Chorus; Mélo'Singers the silver medal for Large Chorus; and Colla Voce the gold medal for Small Chorus. The participating groups were not apprised of the change in rules in advance (or at any time), and when asked for an explanation after the ceremony, the organizers said the cost of so many medals would have been too prohibitive.

See also

 World Outgames
 Gay and Lesbian International Sport Association (GLISA)
 European Gay and Lesbian Sport Federation (EGLSF)
 European Gay and Lesbian Multi-Sports Championships (EuroGames)
 2006 Gay Games / Gay Games / Federation of Gay Games
 XVI International AIDS Conference, 2006

References

External links
 1st World Outgames - Montréal 2006
 Rendez-Vous Montréal 2006 on OutSports.com
 Gay and Lesbian International Sport Association (GLISA)
 Gay Games vs. Outgames - Registrations now open in both cities (QueerSport.org) September 16, 2004
 Asia Pacific Outgames Melbourne 2008 - Play With Your Neighbours!

2006
Sports competitions in Montreal
Multi-sport events in Canada
International sports competitions hosted by Canada
LGBT history in Canada
LGBT events in Canada
LGBT culture in Montreal
2006 in multi-sport events
2006 in LGBT history
2000s in Montreal
2006 in Quebec